Sébastien Balibar (born 14 October 1947 in Tours) is a French physicist and a member of the French Academy of Sciences.

Awards
 1978 – Prix Brelot de la Société Française de Physique 
 1988 – Prix Paul Langevin de l'Académie des Sciences 
 1989 – "Photographic Award", conférence ICCG9, Sendai, Japon (with E. Rolley)
 1994 – Grand Prix du Bicentenaire de l'École Polytechnique (Prix Dargelos) 
 1999 – Professeur Invité, Konstanz Universität, Allemagne 
 1999 – Senior Fellow of the Japan Society for the Promotion of Science 
 1999 – Professeur invité, Kyoto University, Japan
 1999–2000 – Loeb lecturer, Harvard University, USA 
 2003 – Professeur invité, Kyoto University, Japan
 2005 – Fritz London memorial prize [with J.C. Seamus Davis (Cornell) and R.E. Packard (Berkeley)]
 2005 – Fellow of the American Physical Society (voir le site de l'APS)
 2007 – Three Physicists Prize, ENS (Paris)
 2009 – Lauréat de l'European Research Council (ERC Advanced grants)
 2012 – Grand Prix Jean-Ricard de la Société Française de Physique

Bibliography 
 Demain, la physique, par Alain Aspect, Roger Balian, Sébastien Balibar, Edouard Brézin et al., éditions Odile Jacob, Paris 2004
 La Pomme et l'atome, Douze histoires de physique contemporaine, par Sébastien Balibar, éditions Odile Jacob, Paris 2005
 Je casse de l'eau, et autres rêveries scientifiques, par Sébastien Balibar (dessins de Jean Kerleroux), éditions Le Pommier, Paris 2008
 Chercheur au quotidien, par Sébastien Balibar, éditions du Seuil et Raconter la vie, Paris 2014
 Climat: y voir clair pour agir, par Sébastien Balibar, éditions Le Pommier, Paris 2015

References

External links

 Page professionnelle
 Biographie sur le site de l'Académie des Sciences

1947 births
École Polytechnique alumni
Living people